Milkipur is a constituency of the Uttar Pradesh Legislative Assembly covering the city of Milkipur in the Faizabad district of Uttar Pradesh, India.

Milkipur is one of five assembly constituencies in the Faizabad Lok Sabha constituency. Since 2008, this assembly constituency is numbered 273 amongst 403 constituencies.

Election results

2022

2022
Samajwadi Party candidate Avdhesh Prasad won in  2022 Uttar Pradesh Legislative Elections defeating Bhartiya Janata Party candidate Gorakhnath by a margin of 14000 votes.

References

External links
 

Assembly constituencies of Uttar Pradesh
Faizabad district